Maciej Górski may refer to:

 Maciej Górski (politician) (1944–2020), Polish diarist and politician
 Maciej Górski (footballer) (born 1990), Polish footballer